Camillo Graffico (or Grafico) (1565 - 1615) was an Italian engraver born in Cividale del Friuli.

References

Italian engravers
1565 births
1615 deaths